The Council of State of Geneva is the executive organ of the République and Canton of Geneva, in Switzerland.  Geneva has a seven-member Conseil d'État.

The last elections were held on 28 March 2021.

Members

Michèle Righetti holds the non-political position of State Chancellor.

See also
 Grand Council of Geneva

External links
 Council of State official webpage

Politics of the canton of Geneva
Geneva